Carrick was a local government district in Cornwall, England, United Kingdom.  Its council was based in Truro.

The main centres of population, industry and commerce were the city of Truro and the towns of Falmouth/Penryn.

The district was created under the Local Government Act 1972, on 1 April 1974 by the merger of the municipal boroughs of Truro, Falmouth and Penryn, and the Truro Rural District.

It was named after the Carrick Roads, an inlet near Falmouth that the rivers Percuil, Penryn and Fal drain into. The district was abolished as part of the 2009 structural changes to local government in England on 1 April.

Parishes
Carrick comprised the following 27 parishes

See also
Carrick District Council elections

References

External links

 Carrick Council
 Cornwall Record Office Online Catalogue for Carrick District Council

English districts abolished in 2009
Former non-metropolitan districts of Cornwall